Jur Modo is an ethnic group in Sudan numbering about 50,000.  They have a rural way of life, living in relatively isolated compounds.  They speak Jur Modo language, a Nilo-Saharan language, though some speakers also use Arabic, Dinka, Moru, Baka, or Zande.  The principal religion is animism.

References

 Jur Mödö – English Dictionary with Grammar, Andrew Persson and Janet R. Persson), Nairobi, Kenya: S.I.L.-Sudan, 1991

External links
Unasylva 154

Ethnic groups in Sudan